Philip, Phillip or Phil Ford may refer to:

 Philip Ford (film director) (1900–1976), American film director and actor
 Phil Ford (comedian) (1919–2005), vaudeville performer, musician, and comedian
 Phil Ford (writer) (born 1950), British television writer
 Phil Ford (basketball) (born 1956), American basketball player
 Phillip R. Ford (born 1961), American stage and film producer, director, and drag entertainer
 Phil Ford (rugby) (born 1961), Welsh rugby union and rugby league footballer